Chow Tai Fook Centre or just CTF Centre may refer to:
 Chow Tai Fook Centre (Hong Kong), located in Mong Kok, Kowloon, Hong Kong, China
 Guangzhou CTF Finance Centre, located in Guangzhou, China
 Wuhan Chow Tai Fook Finance Centre, located in Wuhan, China
 Tianjin CTF Finance Centre, located in Binhai, Tianjin, China, also known as CTF Binhai Centre

See also
 Chow Tai Fook Hong Kong conglomerate